Carisbrook railway station is a closed railway station on the Moolort railway line at Carisbrook, Victoria. The station was opened on Tuesday, 7 July 1874.

Although no longer in use Carisbrook retains a bricks station building, platform and goods shed.

Calls for Reopening
A movement for the re-opening of the railway line has been gaining momentum over the past 2 years.  On Sunday 8 December 2013 a Community Rally calling for the reopening of the railway station and the railway line will take place. A discussion on the rally and the  Group Rally for the return of rail services can be found on Railpage

References

External links
 Railpage - Carisbrook Railway Station
 Vicrail Stations - Carisbrook
 Vicsig - Carisbrook
 Melway map at street-directory.com.au

Disused railway stations in Victoria (Australia)